Gavar (also Romanized as Gāvār and Gavār; also known as Giavar, Gyavar, and Kavār) is a village in Meydan Chay Rural District, in the Central District of Tabriz County, East Azerbaijan Province, Iran. At the 2006 census, its population was 175, in 45 families.

References 

Populated places in Tabriz County